Hartmut Reck (17 November 1932 – 30 January 2001) was a German television and film actor. He also appeared in the American-produced epic film, The Longest Day. He also acted in the German film dubbing industry, dubbing into German the voices of Anthony Hopkins, John Hurt, Robert Duvall, Michael Caine, Donald Sutherland, Peter Graves, Patrick Stewart, Franco Nero, Terence Hill and others.

Life and career 
Reck was born in Berlin. He made his debut working in theater with the Berliner Ensemble, working under Bertolt Brecht. In 1956, he began working in film and with DEFA in the former German Democratic Republic. He moved to West Germany in 1959, where he played the title role in a television film, Raskolhikoff alongside Paul Verhoeven, Uwe Friedrichsen and Ernst Fritz Fürbringer. The film was based on the novel Crime and Punishment by Fyodor Dostoyevsky.

In 1962, he played in Jeder stirbt für sich allein, Falk Harnack's 1962 television film adaptation of the novel Every Man Dies Alone by Hans Fallada, appearing with Edith Schultze-Westrum, Alfred Schieske and Wolfgang Kieling.

Reck's best known feature film was The Longest Day (1962), an American war film about "D-Day", produced by Darryl F. Zanuck. The film's German and French cast members spoke their lines in their own languages, and in separately filmed sequences, spoke their parts in English. In 1965, he played alongside Karin Dor and Harald Leipnitz in a crime film by Edgar Wallace, Der unheimliche Mönch. In 1968, he played Georges Picquart in a television film version of the Dreyfus Affair on German broadcaster ZDF.

Reck appeared in several guest roles on long-running German television series, Der Kommissar and Tatort. In 1988, he became well known to the German public as "Kommissar Ecki Schöller" in the television series Die Männer vom K3.

In addition to his film and television roles, Reck worked as a voice actor in the German film dubbing industry, dubbing the voices of numerous English-speaking actors into German, including  Anthony Hopkins, John Hurt, Robert Duvall, Michael Caine, Donald Sutherland, Peter Graves, Patrick Stewart, Franco Nero, Terence Hill and others.

Personal 
Hartmut Reck was the father of one son (from a relationship with Vera Tschechowa) and two daughters. He died in Nienburg, Lower Saxony.

Filmography (selected) 
Film
 A Berlin Romance (1956) - Harald
 Zwischenfall in Benderath (1956) - Hans Hellmann
 Berlin, Schoenhauser Corner (1957) - FDJler
 Polonia-Express (1957) - 1. Arbeiter
 Sheriff Teddy (1957) - Robbi
 Tatort Berlin (1957) - Rudi Prange
 Ein Mädchen von 16 ½ (1958) - Rolf
 Tilman Riemenschneider (1958) - Gotthold
 Ware für Katalonien (1959) - Unterleutnant Schellenberg
 Musterknaben (1960) - Bassi
  (1960) - Werner
 Der Schleier fiel… (1960) - Robbi Freitag
 Heaven, Love and Twine (1960) - Friedrich Himmel
 Riviera-Story (1960) - Roy Benter
 The Longest Day (1962) - Sgt. Bernhard Bergsdorf (uncredited)
 The Sinister Monk (1965) - Ronny

Television films and series

 Raskolnikoff (1959) - Raskolnikoff
 Der Prozeß Mary Dugan (1960) - Jimmy Dugan
 Die Dame ist nicht fürs Feuer (1960) - Humphrey Devize
 Der Groß-Cophta (1960) - The Knight
 Ruf zur Leidenschaft (1961) - Tony Burgess
 Spielsalon (1962) - Junger Mann
 Anfrage (1962) - Klaus Köhler
 Jeder stirbt für sich allein (1962) - Karl Hergesell
 Die Glocken von London (1962) - Richard Johnson
 Schlachtvieh (1963) - Engel, Journalist
 Mauern (1963) - Walter Koslowski
 Das Ende vom Lied (1963) - Unteroffizier Mitchem
  (1964), (Francis Durbridge miniseries) - Lewis Richards
 Bericht von den Inseln (1964) - Reporter
 : Zwei Pistolen (1964) - Klaus Bilek
 Das Duell (1964) - Lajewski
 Ein Sommer – ein Herbst (1964) - Dymow
 Keine Angst vor der Hölle? (1965) - Juge Maloine 
 Glück in Frankreich (1965) - Ernst
 Yerma (1965) - Victor
 An einem ganz gewöhnlichen Tag (1966) - Er
 Ein Mädchen von heute (1966)
 Die gelehrten Frauen (1966) - Clitandre
 Fliegender Sand (1967) - Henry Wellington
 Der Vater und sein Sohn (1968) - Vater Sedlmair
 König Richard II (1968) - Bolingbroke
 Affaire Dreyfuss (1968) - Major Picquart
 Alarm (1969) - Prosecutor
 Der Kommissar (1969–1972) - Lehrer Rossmann / Möricke
 Die Hupe – Eine Schülerzeitung (1969) 
 Wir 13 sind 17 (1972)
 Doppelspiel in Paris (1972) - Roman Czerniawski
  (1973), (miniseries based on Hans Fallada novel) - Redakteur Padberg
 Gemeinderätin Schumann (1974) - Kurt Schumann
 Partner gesucht (1976) - Wolf Brinkmann
 Im schönsten Bilsengrunde (1980) - Classen
 Der Aufsteiger (1981) - Eisenlauer
 Betti, die Tochter (1982) - Hans Wedemeier
 Wie es geschah (1983) - Harro Bergmann
 Lauter Glückspilze (1986)
 Quadrille (1986) - Axel Diensen
 Mord am Pool (1986) - Dr. Maurice Young
 Maria Stuart (1986) - Paulet
 Die Sterne schwindeln nicht (1986)
 Das Erbe der Guldenburgs (1987)
 Die Männer vom K3 (1988–2001, 38 episodes) - Ecki Schöller (final television appearance)
 Radiofieber (1989) - Dr. Vock
 Der Fotograf oder Das Auge Gottes (1992)
 Nervenkrieg (1993) - Dr. Andre
 Cornelius hilft (1994)
 Mona M. – Mit den Waffen einer Frau (1996)

Voice acting (dubbing), selected
 Die Rechte und die Linke Hand des Teufels
(My Name Is Trinity, 1971)
 Vier Fäuste für ein Halleluja
(Trinity Is Still My Name, 1972)

References

External links
 
 Filmography filmportal.de 

1932 births
2001 deaths
German male film actors
German male television actors
20th-century German male actors
Male actors from Berlin
East German actors